Boye Christian Riis Strøm (18 June 1847 – 1930) was a Norwegian statistician and civil servant.

He was born in Grue, and graduated with the cand.jur. degree in 1870. He was the director of Statistics Norway from 1882 to 1886, and published the yearbook Statistisk aarbog for Kongeriget Norge. From 1889 to 1915 he served as the Diocesan Governor of Tromsø stiftamt and the County Governor of Tromsø amt.

References

1847 births
1930 deaths
People from Grue, Norway
Norwegian statisticians
Directors of government agencies of Norway
County governors of Norway